This is a list of the National Register of Historic Places listings in Des Moines, Iowa.

This is intended to be a complete list of the properties and districts on the National Register of Historic Places in the city of Des Moines, Iowa, United States. Latitude and longitude coordinates are provided for many National Register properties and districts; these locations may be seen together in an online map.

There are 201 properties and districts listed on the National Register in Polk County, including 2 National Historic Landmarks. The city of Des Moines is the location of 186 properties and districts, including the 2 National Historic Landmarks, and are listed here, while the remaining properties and districts located elsewhere in the county are listed separately. Three properties were once listed but have since been removed.

Current listings

|}

Former listings

|}

See also
 List of National Historic Landmarks in Iowa
 National Register of Historic Places listings in Iowa

References

 
Des Moines